Walang Hanggan (International title: My Eternal) is a 2012 Philippine romantic melodrama television series featuring an ensemble cast headed by Coco Martin, Julia Montes, Dawn Zulueta and Richard Gomez. The story is loosely based on the 1991 Gomez-Zulueta starrer Hihintayin Kita sa Langit, a classic film based on the 1847 Emily Brontë novel Wuthering Heights. The series was aired on ABS-CBN's Primetime Bida evening block and worldwide via The Filipino Channel from January 16, 2012, to October 26, 2012, replacing Nasaan Ka, Elisa? and was replaced by A Beautiful Affair.

The classic drama became a huge hit and maintains the top spot in viewer ratings for most of its run, with its finale episode on October 26, 2012, attaining the highest rating of 45.4% nationwide.

Plot summary
Cruz sisters Henya and Margaret live together with Joseph Montenegro in the fictional province of Olivarez. Henya sacrificed everything to give Margaret a better life. Around two decades later, Joseph and Margaret's son Marco Montenegro, the future heir of the Montenegro's wine business, develops feelings for Emily Cardenas, the daughter of an old worker in their hacienda. Marco gives Emily the Infinity Ring, which means "eternity", as a symbol of their love for each other. However, Margaret's schemes to ruin Emily's relationship with Marco prompts him to marry rich banker Jane Bonifacio, much to the detriment of Emily, who throws the ring away and vows revenge against the Montenegros. One night, Margaret and Henya had a heated misunderstanding about Joseph's love for Henya. Henya decides to leave the mansion so Margaret can live in peace.

Years after Joseph's death, laborer William Alcantara settle in Olivarez with his children Katerina, Onat and Tomas. When Onat died from a deadly flu and the Montenegros migrate to the United States, William adopts a street boy named Daniel into the hacienda Alcantara, where Henya assumes her role as Daniel's adoptive grandmother. Daniel and Katerina become best friends and they gradually develop a very close relationship over the next several years. Tomas remains very resentful towards Daniel and has an addiction to gambling. Margaret, Marco and Jane returns home with their children Nathan and Johanna, who are both becoming interested in Katerina and Daniel respectively. Unknown to everyone else, Emily returns to the country along with her assistant Miguel Ramos, as they begin investigating the Montenegros. After William dies of a severe heart attack, Tomas takes over the hacienda Alcantara with help from Margaret, and he succeeds in destroying Daniel's life, Nathan going to graduation for Katerina's College, But he not to attended in Daniel and Henya however Tomas and he stolen for the money thief, foolish and crooked anger, Tomas punishment to Daniel dragged the horseback forcing, Katerina to live with the Montenegros, and helping Nathan to marry Katerina. Daniel is fatally stabbed by Tomas and plunges down into the waterfalls, but is found alive by Emily and Miguel. Upon recovering, Daniel is heartbroken seeing Katerina and Nathan together and he agrees to live with Emily in Milan, Italy in order to become stronger. Emily tells Daniel about her life in Milan and she has flashbacks of working multiple jobs until she married a rich old man named Marcelo Guidotti.

Two years later, Emily and Daniel returns to the Philippines after learning that Nathan and Katerina are going to be married. However, Daniel fails to arrive in time to stop the wedding. The Guidottis eventually open their wine business to plan their own counter-strike against the Montenegros. Johanna learns the truth from Emily that she is adopted. Daniel and Katerina eventually realize that they still have feelings for each other, but Nathan is secretly watching over them. Henya tries to convince Marco and Emily that Daniel is their biological son. DNA testing confirmed positive results, but Miguel manipulates the results (because of his growing obsession to Emily) and secretly allies himself with Margaret. After the truth is eventually revealed, Daniel agrees to live in the Montenegro mansion to spend more time with Marco as his father, and Emily is reluctant to accept it. Margaret orders Miguel to separate Marco and Emily, but takes a nasty turn when Jane is seemingly killed in a plane bombing by Miguel's accomplice David Conde. With Margaret's reluctant help, Miguel manages to steal billions of money from the Guidotti Imports and the Bonifacio Bank to put into bankruptcy. Later on, Daniel and Miguel eventually confronts each other, but Miguel flees with the money he stole and hides from the authorities. Daniel decides to leave the Montenegro mansion to take care of Emily and Henya.

One year after losing the Guidotti Imports, Emily and Daniel work on their own jobs as Tomas and Nathan try to make their lives miserable. Jane's cousin Jean Bonifacio appears and takes over the Bonifacio Bank that figured in the collapse of Guidotti Imports. Under a cover identity named Black Lily, Jean secretly sends flowers and also meddles in Emily and Marco's relationship as the lovers are engaged. Jean has flashbacks that reveals she is actually Jane, who miraculously survived the plane crash and underwent plastic surgery. Tomas becomes the new president of Guidotti Imports by using the money from Miguel, who is driven by his obsession with Emily and continues to threaten Margaret. Katerina continues to suffer a miserable life with Nathan as his insanity gets too far. Daniel and Katerina attempts to elope together, but Katerina gets abducted by Tomas, and as Johanna discovers the hiding place and tells a depressed Nathan about the location, Nathan confronts and rapes Katerina. She becomes pregnant and runs away to hide in a far-off location, prompting Daniel to persevere in finding her. Whilst hiding from Nathan, Daniel and Katerina eventually reunite in the province of Albay and they discover that Katerina's mother Luisa is alive. Marco and Emily makes a surprise wedding night, but Jean stops them by unmasking her true identity as Jane. After she grants Marco's request for an annulment, Jane gets kidnapped by Miguel, and as Margaret attempts to rescue her, she failed as Miguel shoots Jane to death. Emily manages to lure Miguel into her trap so the authorities can arrest him. Daniel gets into a heated fistfight with Nathan, who stabs himself to frame up Daniel. To save Katerina and Henya's life from Nathan, Daniel surrenders himself to the police for frustrated murder, and reunites with Miguel in jail. Nathan still threatens Katerina, while Daniel is fatally stabbed by a prison mate hired by Miguel, sending him into a coma.

After recovering at a hospital and was released from prison, Daniel vows to stop Nathan from taking Katerina away from him. A reformed Margaret admits that Katerina and Nathan's marriage is null and void because the wedding priest's license was already expired. Daniel finds Nathan and Katerina at the airport, and Johanna tells them the truth about Nathan's fake marriage. Margaret reconciles with Henya before surrendering herself to the police for all her crimes and her alliance with Miguel. Emily and Marco finally get married in the United States, while Miguel fakes his death at the Jones Bridge by getting multiple shots from a sniper by David (under the orders of Tomas) and plunges down into the river. Margaret is finally forgiven by Emily, Marco and Daniel. Nathan tries hard to redeem himself for the better (so he can make Katerina love him again), but Tomas manipulates the whole situation by telling Nathan that Katerina and Daniel are going to be married. More confrontations ensued, Daniel admits that Nathan is the father of Katerina's child, and Katerina explains to everyone how she was raped by Nathan. Marco, Emily and Johanna talks about putting Nathan to a mental hospital, but Nathan overhears them and panics, and as he desperately kidnaps Katerina, Daniel chases after them. An all-out fistfight between Daniel and Nathan results in Katerina suffering a miscarriage. Marco and Emily commits Nathan to a psychiatric hospital, while a mourning Katerina angrily blames Tomas and Nathan for the death of her unborn child. Weeks later, everyone is preparing for Daniel and Katerina's wedding, and Emily learns that the Infinity Ring that Katerina holds for Daniel is the same ring that she had with Marco in the past. Tomas gets banned after a bomb threat in the Montenegro mansion, but Margaret is given a special permit to attend the wedding. Daniel and Katerina are finally married with a grand wedding in Intramuros. At the wedding reception, Margaret announces new positions for the Montenegro Corporation, including Emily as chief operating officer and Daniel as new president of the company. Daniel and Katerina spend their honeymoon at San Francisco. Afterwards, the couple returns home with a brand new wine that will be used in the company's relaunch. Tomas' business becomes bankrupt and Miguel wants his money back, while Daniel comes up with a plan bring down Tomas. In the Masquerade ball at Emily's birthday, Daniel gives her mother a surprise gift with the merge of Montenegro Corporation and Guidotti Imports and the return of Infinity Wine to the company, and Tomas gets very enraged at the Montenegros and Katerina. However, everyone realizes that Miguel is still alive.

Daniel eventually face off in a final showdown with Miguel and Tomas, who kidnaps Katerina and Emily respectively. However, Miguel fatally shoots Katerina and Daniel and the couple ends up in the hospital, but Marco arrives to rescue Emily and kills Miguel in self-defense. Margaret is freed from jail after Miguel's death. Katerina eventually dies at the hospital, and as Daniel mourns at her grave for so many days, Tomas blames him for his sister's death and kills him, much to the anguish and sadness of Emily and Henya. In the epilogue, the Montenegros now live together in the hacienda Alcantara, where Henya and Margaret are thinking about Daniel and Katerina being reunited in the afterlife. Emily and Marco have their own baby, named Daniel. Nathan is released from the psychiatric hospital and returns home with his family. Tomas is sentenced to life imprisonment and is visited by Luisa and Johanna. Several years later, new neighbors visits the hacienda Alcantara during a Christmas gathering where the young Daniel meets the couple's daughter named Catherine. The story ends with Daniel and Katerina living happily ever after in heaven.

Cast and characters

Main cast
 Coco Martin as Daniel Guidotti / Daniel Montenegro
 Julia Montes as Katerina Alcantara
 Dawn Zulueta as Emilia "Emily" Cardenas-Guidotti 
 Richard Gomez as Marco Montenegro

Supporting cast
 Susan Roces as Virginia "Henya" Cruz
 Helen Gamboa as Margaret Cruz-Montenegro
 Paulo Avelino as Nathaniel "Nathan" Montenegro
 Melissa Ricks as Johanna Montenegro / Patricia Bonifacio
 Joem Bascon as Tomas Alcantara
 Rita Avila / Eula Valdez as Jane Bonifacio-Montenegro / Jean "Black Lily" Bonifacio
 Nonie Buencamino as Miguel Ramos

Extended cast
 Shamaine Buencamino as Luisa Alcantara
 Ogie Diaz as Kenneth
 Arlene Muhlach as Perla
 John Medina as James Ocampo
 Josh Ivan Morales as David Conde
 Eda Nolan as Lorraine Delgado

Guest cast
 Richard Yap as Henry de Dios
 Nanding Josef as Ernesto
 Menggie Cobarrubias as John Bonifacio
 Olive Isidro as Edith Bonifacio
 Froilan Sales as Hugo Rivera
 Lui Manansala as Laarni Peralta
 Arvin Gison as Jonathan "Onat" Alcantara
 Fred Payawan as Luis Villareal
 Dino Imperial as Jack
 Ivan Dorschner as Katerina's debut party guest (18 Rose)
 Patrick Sugui as Katerina's debut party guest (18 Rose)
 DM Sevilla as Katerina's debut party guest (18 Rose)
 Maichel Fideles as Katerina's debut party guest
 Marion Gopez as Katerina's debut party guest
 Piero Vergara as Katerina's debut party guest
 Shey Bustamante as Katerina's debut party guest
 Tricia Santos as Katerina's debut party guest and schoolmate
 Fretzie Bercede as Katerina's debut party and schoolmate
 Manuel Chua as Tomas' friend
 RJ Calipus as Tomas' friend
 Marion dela Cruz as Tomas' friend
 Jef-Henson Dee as Padrino
 Andre Tiangco as Atty. Ronald Meneses
 Apollo Abraham as Benjamin Mercado
 Marnie Lapus as Ms. Mercado
 Alvin Fortuna as NBI agent
 Giovanni Baldisseri as Bida Resureccion
 Pontri Bernardo as Mr. Lim
 Gilleth Sandico as Restaurant manager
 Wendy Valdez as Nathan's prostitute
 William Lorenzo as Homer Reyes
 Ricardo Cepeda as Atty. Norman
 Dante Rivero as Teban
 Archie Adamos as Domeng
 Tom Olivar as Jail Chief Warden
 PJ Endrinal as Joaquin
 Valerie Concepcion as Wedding planner
 Gary Valenciano as himself (singer for wedding of Daniel and Katerina)
 Bryan Termulo as himself (singer for wedding of Daniel and Katerina)
 Gerard Salonga and the ABS-CBN Philharmonic Orchestra as themselves
 Ateneo Chamber Singers as themselves
 Mon Confiado as Brando

Special participation
 Eddie Gutierrez as Joseph Montenegro
 Joel Torre as William Alcantara
 Spanky Manikan as Herman Cardenas
 Yogo Singh as young Daniel
 Dexie Daulat as young Katerina
 Andrei Garcia as young Tomas
 John Vincent Servilla as young Nathan
 Yasmine Andrea Aguinaldo as Joanne Montenegro
 EJ Jallorina as young Kenneth
 Sheryl Cruz as young Henya
 Ciara Sotto as young Margaret
 Melissa Mendez as Hilda Cruz (Henya and Margaret's mother)
 Mark Gil as Mr. Cruz (Henya and Margaret's father)

Official soundtrack
The drama's main theme song "Hanggang Sa Dulo Ng Walang Hanggan", composed by songwriter George Canseco, is performed by Filipino singer Gary Valenciano. The song was originally covered by Richard Reynoso as a theme song for the 1991 film Hihintayin Kita Sa Langit, starring Richard Gomez and Dawn Zulueta. The song was also covered by Ayegee Paredes for the 2001 soap opera Sa Dulo ng Walang Hanggan, starring Claudine Barretto and Mylene Dizon.

A second album titled Walang Hanggan: The Official Soundtrack Volume 2 was released with new songs including "Pangako" by Martin Nievera, "Sana Maulit Muli" by Ice Seguerra, and "Kahit Isang Saglit" by Juris. Another cover of the drama's theme song is sung by Nina.

Insert songs also include "Natutulog Ba Ang Diyos?" by Gary Valenciano (from the 2008 album Rebirth) and "Kastilyong Buhangin" by Regine Velasquez (from the 1991 album Tagala Talaga). For the final ten episodes, unreleased songs include the orchestral versions of "Dadalhin" by Bryan Termulo and "Hanggang Sa Dulo Ng Walang Hanggan" by Gary Valenciano, both arranged by the ABS-CBN Philharmonic Orchestra and the Ateneo Chamber Singers.

Production

Marketing
The first full-length trailer was released on December 17, 2011, via the drama-anthology Maalaala Mo Kaya.

From January 9 to 13, 2012, the cast members of the series appeared via the morning talk show Kris TV where they promoted the series. First to make an appearance were Richard Gomez and Dawn Zulueta, followed by the artists of the Walang Hanggan: The Official Soundtrack album. On January 11, Julia Montes, Melissa Ricks, Joem Bascon and Paulo Avelino promoted their latest drama. This was followed by a guest appearance of Helen Gamboa and Susan Roces on January 12. By January 13, Coco Martin, the series' lead actor who coincidentally is the talk show's most requested guest, gave a special appearance.

Gomez once again promoted the series by guesting in the noontime variety show Happy Yipee Yehey! on January 14, the same day of the series' advanced special screening held at SM Megamall, the screening was attended by many acclaimed artists and critics namely Gomez' wife Lucy Torres with Kris Aquino, Vice Ganda and Liz Uy. Also present in the said screening was My Binondo Girl's Richard Yap, Zulueta's husband Cong. Anton Lagdameo, and Garrie Concepcion.

On January 15, the cast visited at SM North Skydome for a Grand Fans Day and for the release of the series' original soundtrack, they also guested in the musical variety show ASAP, followed by another appearance of Gomez in the late-night talk show Gandang Gabi, Vice! while Paulo Avelino guested in The Buzz.

After its successful premiere and the viewer's warm support, the cast launched Pagmamahalang Walang Hanggan: The Nationwide Mall Tour. In February 5, the cast visited SM City Lucena followed by an appearance in February 12 at SM City Pampanga. In February 18, the cast continued their appreciation stopping at Gaisano Capital Mall in Mactan, Cebu City. In February 25, Coco Martin visited Koronadal, General Santos City as well as being part of the Fun Feb Night concert with Jed Madela and Juris to promote the drama.  In March 3, Martin, Ricks, Avelino, Bascon and Montes stopped by at Panagbenga Festival in Baguio. The cast continued the tour in Gaisano Mall of Davao Atrium in March 17 and was followed by a tour at Panaad Stadium Bacolod City in April 14.

A thanksgiving concert entitled "Walang Hanggang Pasasalamat" was staged on October 21, 2012, at the Araneta Coliseum. The said concert was also broadcast live on the same date on ABS-CBN's Sunday Best. The concert coincided with the show's final week on the air.

Merchandising
ABS-CBN took advantage of the drama's popularity to partner with local jeweler Karat World to produce an "infinity ring," a special ring shaped like intertwined infinity loops. The rings are available in 14-karat solid yellow gold, 14-karat solid white gold, and silver 925. Each ring also has an "infinity marking" and a 585-stamping "to signify its gold purity." They also released infinity necklaces and earrings.

Reception

Ratings
The series' premiere drew in an impressive 32.1% in the 9:15 PM timeslot. Because of its consistent high ratings, the show was moved to an earlier timeslot at 8:15 PM where it continued to record stellar ratings. The series finale episode on October 26, 2012, drew in a record-breaking 45.4% nationwide audience share, topping its previous all-time highest rating of 44.7%. The drama also captivated the viewers and netizens on social networking sites, becoming the most talked-about topic online. The drama's title was the number one worldwide trending topic on Twitter during the airing of its final episode. According to a release from Kantar Media-TNS data, Walang Hanggan is the only Filipino drama of 2012 to have surpassed the 40% margin, registering a 41% ratings share on May 23, followed by 41.4% on June 15, and 44.7% on June 29.

Awards and nominations

Reruns
Reruns of Walang Hanggan are broadcast through Jeepney TV.

On March 18, 2020, Dreamscape Entertainment announced that Walang Hanggan will have a rerun beginning March 23, 2020, on ABS-CBN's Kapamilya Gold afternoon block, weekdays at 2:30pm. It was a part of ABS-CBN's temporary programming changes due to the enhanced community quarantine done to lower the spread of the COVID-19 pandemic in the Philippines. However, this rerun abruptly ended after the National Telecommunications Commission issued a cease and desist order against ABS-CBN.

Notes

See also
 List of programs broadcast by ABS-CBN
 List of ABS-CBN drama series
 List of Wuthering Heights adaptations
 Hihintayin Kita sa Langit
 The Promise

References

External links
Official website
Walang Hanggan on ABS-CBN.com

ABS-CBN drama series
Philippine melodrama television series
Philippine romance television series
Filipino-language television shows
2012 Philippine television series debuts
2012 Philippine television series endings
Films based on Wuthering Heights
Live action television shows based on films
Television series by Dreamscape Entertainment Television
Television shows filmed in the Philippines
Television shows filmed in Italy
Television shows filmed in California